Ring of Honor (ROH) is an American professional wrestling promotion based in Baltimore, Maryland. Former employees in ROH consist of professional wrestlers, managers, play-by-play and color commentators, announcers, interviewers, and referees.

List of ROH alumni
The Cross  indicates that the past talent is deceased (Which means no longer living).

Male wrestlers

Female wrestlers

Special guests

Former students

Shimmer Women Athletes (2005–2011)

Commentators and interviewers

New Japan Pro-Wrestling (2014–2019)

World Wonder Ring Stardom (2017–2020)

Outsiders
The following wrestlers appeared in Ring of Honor, but didn't "officially" work for them at the time.

See also
List of professional wrestlers

References

ROH roster
Ring of Honor at OWW.com

External links
ROHwrestling.com (Official website)

Alumni
Ring of Honor alumni